Oidaematophorus parshuramus is a moth of the family Pterophoridae that is endemic to India.

References

Oidaematophorini
Moths described in 2003
Endemic fauna of India
Moths of Asia